Rehab Reunion is the sixth album (fourth studio album) by Bruce Hornsby with his current touring band, the Noisemakers. Released on June 17, 2016, the album is notable in that Hornsby, widely recognized for his piano capabilities, does not play piano on the album at all. Rather, he plays the dulcimer. The album also marks Hornsby's first release on 429 Records.

Like on many of his previous releases, Rehab Reunion features collaborations with guest artists close to Hornsby. Justin Vernon of Bon Iver sings background vocals on "Over the Rise" and Mavis Staples duets with Hornsby on "Celestial Railroad". Also noteworthy is a folk version of "The Valley Road", originally a hit in 1988 with Hornsby's first backing band, the Range.

Track listing

Personnel 
 Bruce Hornsby – lead vocals, dulcimer
 John "J. T." Thomas – organ
 Gibb Droll – electric guitars, acoustic guitars
 Ross Holmes – fiddle, mandolin
 J. V. Collier – bass
 Sonny Emory – drums, washboard,  cajón
 Moyes Lucas – washboard on "The Valley Road"
 Mavis Staples – lead vocals on "Celestial Railroad"
 Justin Vernon – backing vocals on "Over the Rise"

Production 
 Producer and Art Direction – Bruce Hornsby
 Production Assistant – Patti Oates Martin
 Engineers – B. J. Burton, Matt Lejeune and Wayne Pooley.
 Mixing – Bruce Hornsby and Wayne Pooley 
 Mastered by Gavin Lurssen at Lurssen Mastering (Hollywood, California).
 Graphic Design – Chip DeMatteo
 Cover Photography – Kathy Hornsby 
 Photo Booklet – Kathy Hornsby, Lex Selig and Sean Smith.

Charts

References

2016 albums
Bruce Hornsby albums
429 Records albums